Estonia competed at the 2013 World Championships in Athletics in Moscow, Russia, from 10–18 August 2013 and won 1 bronze medal.

Medalists
The following competitor from Estonia won a medal at the Championships

Results

Men

400 metres hurdles

Decathlon

Discus throw

Javelin throw

Women

Heptathlon

High jump

Javelin throw

References

Nations at the 2013 World Championships in Athletics
World Championships in Athletics
2013